The Cantons of Rouen are cantons situated in the Seine-Maritime département and in the Normandy region of northern France. Since the French canton reorganisation which came into effect in March 2015, the commune of Rouen is subdivided into 3 cantons:
Canton of Rouen-1 (pop. 38,082)
Canton of Rouen-2 (pop. 36,051)
Canton of Rouen-3 (pop. 37,424)

See also 
 Arrondissements of the Seine-Maritime department
 Cantons of the Seine-Maritime department
 Communes of the Seine-Maritime department

References

Rouen
Rouen